Michal Černák (born 1 September 2003) is a Czech footballer who currently plays as a midfielder for Jablonec.

Career statistics

Club

Notes

References

2003 births
Living people
Czech footballers
Czech Republic youth international footballers
Association football forwards
Bohemian Football League players
Czech First League players
FK Jablonec players